A Technological University is a designation of a type of third-level institution in Ireland. The potential for such universities was established through legislation in 2018. Since then, various groups of institutes of technology began a merger process to create five technological universities:
 Technological University Dublin was established in January 2019 as the result of a merger of the three Institutes of Technology in the County Dublin area. Its foundation was announced in July 2018.
 Munster Technological University was established in January 2021 following the merger of IT Tralee and Cork IT. A formal application for the TU for the south west, comprising Cork IT and IT Tralee, was lodged in February 2019, but it was initially unsuccessful. A second, successful, application was made in 2020.
 The Technological University of the Shannon: Midlands Midwest was formed from a merger of Athlone IT and Limerick IT. It was announced in October 2019 forming a TU for the mid-west and midlands regions, centred on the River Shannon. Athlone IT had investigated the possibility of becoming a university in its own right. A formal application for TU status was made by the consortium in November 2020, with approval granted in May 2021. It opened in October 2021, with campuses distributed amongst Limerick City, Athlone, Clonmel, Ennis, and Thurles.
 Atlantic Technological University was formed following the merger of Galway-Mayo IT (GMIT) and IT Sligo, both in Connacht in the west of Ireland, with Letterkenny IT (LYIT), located in the north of Ireland. The Connacht-Ulster Alliance (CUA) submitted a formal application to the Department of Further and Higher Education in May 2021. Formal approval was granted by Simon Harris, Minister for Further and Higher Education, in October 2021, with a launch date in early 2022.
 South East Technological University is the merger of IT Carlow and Waterford IT. A vision document was published in 2015, and a memorandum of understanding was signed in 2017. At the launch of TU Dublin in July 2018, the Taoiseach expressed regret that this TUSE bid had not progressed sufficiently following the "Technological Universities Act 2018". Staff of IT Carlow, rejected the current plan for the TU in June 2019. A formal application was made in May 2021, and it was formally established in May 2022.

, Dundalk Institute of Technology (DkIT) announced plans to join an existing TU. It had previously investigated the possibility of becoming a TU in its own right. , DkIT was looking at a merger with an existing TU.

References

External links 
 Council of Directors of Institutes of Technology

Education in the Republic of Ireland
Universities and colleges in the Republic of Ireland
Science and technology in the Republic of Ireland
Institutes of technology in the Republic of Ireland